Riccardo Bagaini (born 12 October 2000) is an Italian Paralympic athlete who competes in sprinting events in international elite competitions. He is a World silver medalist and a four-time European medalist. He was born without his left forearm due to amniotic band syndrome.

References

2000 births
Living people
People from Sorengo
Paralympic athletes of Italy
Italian male sprinters
Medalists at the World Para Athletics Championships
Medalists at the World Para Athletics European Championships
Swiss emigrants to Italy